Dabolim railway station (station code: DBM) is a main railway station in South Goa district, Goa. Its code is DBM. It serves Dabolim city. The station consists of one platform. It is not well sheltered. It lacks many facilities including water and sanitation. The station is just 5 km from Goa International Airport.

Major trains

 Vasco da Gama–Kulem Passenger

References

Hubli railway division
Railway stations in South Goa district